Diocese of Sydney or Archdiocese of Sydney could refer to:
Anglican Diocese of Sydney
Roman Catholic Archdiocese of Sydney
Russian Orthodox Diocese of Sydney, Australia and New Zealand